Dipkun is a settlement in Tyndinsky District of Amur Oblast, Russia, located  east of Tynda on the Baikal Amur Mainline (BAM).

The settlement was founded in 1975 with the construction of the BAM, built by Komsomol brigades from around Moscow.  The name of the settlement comes from the Evenk word for the number eight.

While Dipkun is located on the same latitude as Moscow, its climate is far more severe, with long, cold winters.

References

Rural localities in Tyndinsky District